Come Closer, Folks is a 1936 American comedy film directed by D. Ross Lederman. A print is preserved in the Library of Congress collection.

Cast
 James Dunn as Jim Keene
 Marian Marsh as Peggy Woods
 Wynne Gibson as Mae
 George McKay as Rudolph
 Gene Lockhart as Elmer Woods
 Herman Bing as Herman
 John Gallaudet as Pitchman
 Gene Morgan as Pitchman
 Wallis Clark as Mr. Houston

References

External links
 
 

1936 films
1936 comedy films
American comedy films
American black-and-white films
1930s English-language films
Films directed by D. Ross Lederman
Columbia Pictures films
1930s American films
English-language comedy films